The Order of the Sword & Shield National Honor Society (OSSNHS) is an American honor society for undergraduate students, graduate students, and professionals in the fields of homeland security, intelligence, emergency management, and all protective security disciplines.

The National Honor Society is also known by its Greek designation Omicron Sigma Sigma (ΟΣΣ). The official colors are gold and blue. The official motto in Latin is ex scientia pax which means out of knowledge comes peace.

Founding 

The Order of the Sword & Shield was established in 2010 at St. Johns University by Professor Jeffrey Grossmann. The organization was created to be the first national honor society dedicated exclusively to homeland security, intelligence, emergency management and all protective security disciplines.

Membership requirements 
In order to qualify, undergraduate students must have a 3.25 overall grade point average or higher (on a 4.0 scale) and have completed 50 percent of their overall program if they are majoring in a field within the honor society's charter. For graduate students to qualify, they must have a 3.5 overall GPA or higher (on a 4.0 scale) and must also have completed over 50 percent of their program to apply for membership. In addition, a letter of recommendation and an unofficial transcript is required. Professionals who have demonstrated significant achievement in a homeland security, intelligence, emergency management, or security-related occupation may also apply. They must have five years of experience and submit a letter of recommendation and resume.

References

External links
 

Honor societies
Student societies in the United States
Organizations established in 2010
Order
2010 establishments in New York City